The 3rd World Festival of Youth and Students (WFYS) was held from 5 to 19 August 1951 in Berlin, capital city of the then German Democratic Republic, and organised by World Federation of Democratic Youth. The motto of the festival was "Peace and Friendship against Nuclear Weapons"

The third WFYS was held in a period of growing international tension between the Soviet Union and the western powers; it took place against the background of the Korean War and the spread of communism in Central Europe and China. The festival was meant to showcase the young German Democratic Republic, formed in the Soviet sector of postwar Germany.

West German police and the US military tried to prevent international delegates from crossing the western sector of Germany to attend the festival. In response, an operation was arranged to smuggle young people across the country in small groups. Jan Myrdal wrote about incidents where young people were shot at by West Berlin police when trying to cross the West German border.

The festival's sports programme featured an athletics competition.

References

External links
Poster

World Festival of Youth and Students
International sports competitions hosted by East Germany
1951 in East Germany
1951 conferences
1951 in multi-sport events
Multi-sport events in East Germany
Festivals in East Germany
East Berlin
Events in Berlin
1950s in Berlin
Sports festivals in Germany
1951 festivals
1951 in East German sport